Last Woman on Earth (often referred to as The Last Woman on Earth, but it appeared without the word The in the film's title card) is a 1960 American science fiction film that was produced and directed by Roger Corman. It tells the story of three survivors of a mysterious apocalypse, which appears to have wiped out all human life on earth.

The screenplay is by Robert Towne, who also acted in the film under the pseudonym Edward Wain. The music was composed and conducted by Ronald Stein. The film was originally released as a double feature with The Little Shop of Horrors.

Plot

Harold Gern (Antony Carbone), a successful businessman from New York who is constantly in legal trouble, is spending a holiday in Puerto Rico with his attractive wife, Evelyn (Betsy Jones-Moreland), whom he married "between trials." They are joined by Martin Joyce (Robert Towne, billed as Edward Wain), Harold's lawyer, who has come to discuss the latest indictment.

Harold invites him along on a boat trip during which all three try out some newly bought scuba diving equipment. When they resurface, they are unable to breathe without using their scuba tanks. They climb back into their boat and find Manuel, the crewman, dead, apparently of asphyxiation. Upon rowing ashore, they enter the jungle. With their air running out, they discover that the foliage gives off oxygen that they can breathe.

When they go into town, they find nobody left alive and cannot contact anyone by radio. It dawns upon the three that they might be the only survivors in the area, maybe in the world. The domineering Harold takes charge. They concentrate on becoming self-sufficient, and the two men fish, as marine creatures have survived. Later, they also find living insects and baby chicks, presumably newly hatched. Harold feels that in the long run, they will have to move north to a colder climate to avoid problems with insects and food preservation and to increase their chances of meeting other survivors.

Harold asserts ownership of Eve as the husband.  Martin reminds him the rules have changed.  Eve has never felt love from Harold and was only a possession.  She finds freedom.  Harold and Martin have a physical fight after Martin has slept with Eve.  She tells her husband she was not raped.  Harold gives Martin two hours to leave.  Eve wants Martin to ask her to come with him and he does.  The two leave together and Harold follows in a chase to the boat.  Harold beats up and kills Martin.  He holds out his hand to Eve and the two go together.

Home media
The film is in the public domain, and several DVD editions exist, including one by Alpha Video. Most are copies of black and white 16 mm prints, struck for television, but a faded colour print is carried by the Internet Archive. The Retromedia release is transferred from a color-corrected 35 mm print and was released on DVD through Image Entertainment, featuring introductions by Corman, with commentary tracks by Jones-Moreland and Carbone. The release also features the other two films in Corman's "Puerto Rico Trilogy," Creature from the Haunted Sea and Battle of Blood Island, shot back to back with Last Woman.

See also

 List of American films of 1960
Five, 1951 film directed by Arch Oboler
 List of films in the public domain in the United States
 The World, the Flesh and the Devil, 1959 film directed by Ranald MacDougall

References

External links

 
 
  (from faded colour print)
  (higher resolution, from higher-quality black-and-white print)
 Last Woman on Earth DVD review
Review of film at Variety

1960 films
American science fiction horror films
American dystopian films
1960s English-language films
Films directed by Roger Corman
Films set in Puerto Rico
American independent films
American post-apocalyptic films
1960s science fiction horror films
Films with screenplays by Robert Towne
Films produced by Roger Corman
Films scored by Ronald Stein
Articles containing video clips
1960 independent films
1960s American films